Dirt Bike Annie was a rock band from Jersey City, New Jersey that played pop punk and power pop music. Founder, guitarist and lead singer Adam Rabuck has gone on to form The Impulse International    and Rock University at Pennridge High School.

Band history
Dirt Bike Annie was formed in 1993 by Adam Rabuck while he was a student at New York University. The band's two other consistent members throughout the years were bassist/vocalist Dan Paquin and guitarist/vocalist Jeanie Lee. Drummers in the band include Mike Yannich (later of The Ergs!), Heth Weinstein (later of Heth and Jed, who during his tenure with the band was called "Dirt Bike Deano"), Tommy Vinton from Too Much Joy, and Dennis Donaghy.

At the top of 1996, Dirt Bike Annie released their first 7" on their own label called Richie Records.

During the early phase of the career of rapper MC Chris, Dirt Bike Annie regularly performed as his backing band under their stage name, 'The Lee Majors'.

In 2003, the band contributed two songs to the Project Gotham Racing 2 soundtrack.

After a decade of touring and releasing records, the group disbanded in 2005 when Lee and Paquin each left the band. One of their last shows together was on May 3 of that year, opening for MC Chris at the Continental in New York City. Lee left the band first, and Paquin decided to leave shortly thereafter. At that point, the remaining members decided it best to break up the band for good.

In 2010, Rabuck, Paquin and Mike Yannich played a 90-minute reunion set at the Insubordination Fest in Baltimore.

Discography

CDs
 Hit The Rock — Mutant Pop Records, 1999
 Live Jersey City 2000: Sweatin' to the Oldies — Mutant Pop Records, 2000
 It Ain't Easy Bein' Single (Vinyl EPs and Rarities) — Dirt Nap Records, 2001
 The Ellis Island Rendezvous — Stardumb Records, 2002 Split with The Popsters.
 Show Us Your Demons — Dirt Nap Records, 2003

Vinyl
 It Ain't Easy Bein' Stupid EP — Richie Records, 1996
 Choco-Berri Sugar Pops EP — Mutant Pop Records
 Night of the Living Rock and Roll Creation EP — Knock Knock Records
 The Wedding EP — Whoa Oh Records Split double EP with the Kung Fu Monkeys.

External links
Dirt Bike Annie page at Knock Knock Records

References

Pop punk groups from New Jersey
Musical groups established in 1993
Musical groups disestablished in 2005
1993 establishments in New Jersey